Annoying Orange is an American live-action/animated comedy web series created by Dane Boedigheimer (known online as DaneBoe). The series follows an anthropomorphic orange who annoys fruits, vegetables, and various other objects by telling crude jokes and puns until their demise. In addition, the show satirizes and parodies pop culture, including television programs and commercials, anime series, films, music, celebrities, politicians, fairy tales, video games; and internet culture, with a touch of off-color humor, surreal humor and gross-out humor.  

The show became popular, leading to three video games, a range of toys, backpacks, couches, pillows, blankets, lunch boxes, drink bottles, mattresses, towels, plushies and a T-shirt line. Other accessories, such as costumes of the series characters, have also appeared on the market.

The original web series has also expanded to multiple separate series, such as The Adventures of Liam The Leprechaun, The Misfortune of Being Ned, The Marshmallow Show, the television series The High Fructose Adventures of Annoying Orange and many YouTube secondary channels featuring the rest of the main characters as well as a gaming channel. It also has released episodes such as Ask Orange, The Juice, Emoji Raps, Foodsplosion, How2, Adventures of Buttman, Storytime, Let's Play, Annoying Orange vs, Annoying Orange - (insert random thing here) Challenges and Trailer Trashed. A Halloween-themed event called Shocktober has been releasing on every month of October since 2013, meanwhile, a Christmas-themed event called X-Massacre has only aired in December 2017. A compilation of episodes with a particular theme called Saturday Supercut has also been released on Saturdays since 2017 and the Spin-off The Juice.

The Annoying Orange YouTube channel had around 11.5 million subscribers in December 2022.

Plot

The show is centered on Orange (voiced by Dane Boedigheimer), who lives in a kitchen with other foods and objects like his best friend, Pear, an irritable, geeky Bartlett pear (also voiced by Boedigheimer). Other fruits include Passion, a sensible passion fruit and Orange's love interest (voiced by Justine Ezarik), an arrogant Grapefruit (voiced by Bob Jennings; later Jon Bailey), a tiny but hot-blooded Red Delicious apple known as Midget Apple (though he prefers the name Little Apple), a happy-go-lucky and slightly eccentric Marshmallow who always sees everything filled with enthusiasm, and an elderly lemon named Grandpa Lemon, all joining the show over the years. Other characters include Dr Bananas (a banana who is a mad scientist), Squash (a large squash that has the habit of landing on objects and squashing them), Corey (a Golden Delicious apple that is cut in half. There is a running joke at Corey tries to find another butt to replace his old one. But with no success), Sis (Orange's sister), and Baby Orange (an infant orange. Though whether he is a related to Orange is not explained).

The formula for most episodes consists of Orange heckling other characters until they meet a sudden, gruesome end, usually being killed or mutilated by a chef's knife (although implements used to maim them range from a blender to a toy pinwheel). Orange usually tries to warn them by crying out the weapon-in-use, such as "Knife!".

Orange has recurring mannerisms. He often begins an episode by repeatedly calling for a character's attention until the character responds. Orange also often refers to the character as something playing on the object's name or appearance (such as calling Grapefruit "Apefruit"). If an object behaves in a way that Orange dislikes, he will often call that object an "apple" (the food equivalent to "asshole"), even if the object is not an apple. Otherwise, Orange tells jokes, burps, breaks wind or makes noises with his tongue to get attention.

Despite the contentions of other fruits and objects, Orange generally cannot control his quirks and rarely tries to annoy others on purpose; he usually means well for most fruits and objects. In one web episode Mango, a life coach, suggests that Orange is using his annoying nature to cope with the demise of the fruits he tries to befriend. Regardless of his outward anti-social behaviour, Orange almost always finds comfort in the company of his friends and sometimes makes new ones.

Characters

Main
 (voiced by Dane Boedigheimer) – The main protagonist in the series. He can spit seeds from his mouth and has a passion for breaking wind, TNT, kazoos, making noises (such as "nya, nya" and the roar of a motorboat engine) and touching his tongue to his eyeball. Yet he appears to be good-hearted, to the point of warning his guests about their imminent deaths. Orange enjoys making puns and jokes, usually punctuated with his signature laugh. Orange also has a fear of dancing hippos.
 (voiced by Dane Boedigheimer) – a D'Anjou pear. The only fruit who puts up with Orange (at least most of the time), and is arguably his best friend, although Pear would refuse to admit it. Other foods regard Pear as a bore, owing to his passion for reading; he is often the butt of jokes throughout the series. As such, Pear occasionally resorts to extreme behaviours to defy the idea that he is boring.
 / Little Apple (voiced by Dane Boedigheimer) – A diminutive Red Delicious apple who prefers to be called "Little Apple" – as he hates the appellation "Midget Apple" for being insensitive to fruits his size. He owns a monster truck and is often ridiculed for his height, mostly by Orange. He's also ridiculed for being illiterate, which he constantly denies. He's an expert at horror video games, according to the Gaming Channel. His catchphrase is "Neato burrito!"
 (voiced by Dane Boedigheimer) – A cute, happy go lucky, squeaky-voiced marshmallow who is almost always happy. Marshmallow is regarded to be Midget Apple's best friend. They love unicorns (their mother herself is a unicorn), rainbows, cuddly animals, and all things cute. A running source of humour involves questioning Marshmallow's gender – although Marshmallow has self-referred to be male even in their early appearances but was later said to be non-binary since the episode "PRIDE". Marshmallow is given to say "Yay!" a lot and has an audacious giggle.
 (voiced by Justine Ezarik) – A sweet, sassy passion fruit who is Orange's love interest - although Orange is embarrassed to admit he loves her. Grapefruit is also in love with Passion, although she hates him. At one point, she dated a giant granadilla named GG, whom she later found out was her cousin. Their relationship did not last long.
Grandpa Lemon (voiced by Kevin Brueck) – An elderly lemon who constantly falls asleep and often mishears words. In his first appearance, Grandpa Lemon died, being sliced and juiced into a glass of lemonade. He was resurrected in "Frankenfruit" and has appeared subsequently since then. Despite his old age, he drives a stunt-optimized motorcycle. In the High Fructose Adventures of Annoying Orange episode "Veggie Zombies", Grandpa Lemon mentions a character called Grandma Lime, presumed to be his wife, although it is unconfirmed if she is alive or dead, as she has not been mentioned since then in the series.
 (voiced by Bob Jennings from 2010 to 2021; Jon Bailey 2021-present) – A brawny grapefruit who has a bit of a temper - and who others (often Orange) often call fat, much to his displeasure. Like Grandpa Lemon, he was killed by Knife in his first appearance and was resurrected in "Frankenfruit" as the head of the titular amalgamated monster, and subsequently has appeared since then. In earlier seasons, he was antagonistic, but in later seasons has become part of the main cast. He has a bodybuilder's personality, enjoys flexing and using bodybuilding terms a lot. He also likes to impress others, particularly female foods, although he usually fails at this due to his foul luck. Following Bob Jennings' departure from the role in 2021, the episode "Grapefruit’s New Voice!" introduced Jon Bailey as his new voice actor.
Orange's sister (voiced by Jess Lizama) – Also referred to as Sis, she is just as annoying as her brother Orange. Originally a one-time character, over time, her prominence has grown to that of a recurring character, and then a major character (even appearing in episodes of The Juice and Storytime), likely due to the noticeable lack of female main characters, due to Passion's less frequent appearances in later episodes.

Recurring/Minor
Knife (voiced by Kevin Nalty, later by Dane Boedigheimer, singing voice by Peter Coffin) – A chef's knife who often kills various foods against his will. He is terrified both by the fact that he is used to mutilating food and by a cruel knife sharpener who seems to enjoy Knife's suffering.
Liam the Leprechaun (portrayed by Bob Jennings) – A short-tempered leprechaun who is always losing his pot of gold, and ever since first encountering Orange, has become among his most bitter enemies. He has his own YouTube channel. In early episodes, Orange refers to him as the "Jolly Green Giant". With Bob Jennings' departure from the series in 2021, Liam has been retired as a character.
Zoom, Zip & Zoop (voiced by Bob Jennings) – Energy drinks —
Squash (voiced by Dane Boedigheimer) – A nervous butternut squash who invariably falls onto various foods by mistake and, to his horror and disgust, crushes them to death. Squash does not intend to hurt anyone.
Copper Lincoln (voiced by Bob Jennings) – A miniature copper Abraham Lincoln statue who enjoys break dancing and was birthed by an ordinary penny after being swallowed and coughed up by a magic oyster.
 Dr. Bananas (voiced by Aaron Massey) – A brilliant, rather insane banana scientist whose inventions have been known to be incredible achievements or to have caused certain death. Although sliced in two by Knife in his debut, he managed to reconnect his two halves with an invention known as the Slice-Twice-Splice Machine – with the side effect that electricity surges through his stitching, although this side effect appears to have gone away in later appearances.
Nude Dude (voiced by Jack Douglass, later Kevin Brueck) – An apple who became permanently naked after being put into an electric peeler. It is revealed in "Barewolf" that he is a werewolf. Episodes after his debut usually depict him with a censor bar over his groin area, despite him (and all other foods) having no visible genitalia.
Captain Obvious (voiced by Steve Zaragoza, later Shannon Jones) – A sea captain onion who always points out the obvious, much to the annoyance of others.
Lou the Tick (voiced by Michael "Mike 3D" Wingate) – A conspiracy theorist tick who lives in a tinfoil tent, always worrying about aliens possibly taking over the Earth. His name and species are a play on the word "lunatic".
Corey Apple (voiced by Kevin Brueck) – Midget Apple's literal "half-brother", Corey is a golden delicious apple who managed to survive a knife attack, although losing his backside in the process, which he constantly talks about or tries to replace in his very frequent appearances. He tends to be over-the-top and appears rather oblivious or dopey at times since the knife injury also appears to have damaged his brain.
Baby Orange (voiced by Dane Boedigheimer) – Baby Orange is, as his name implies, an infant orange whom is looked after by the main cast. Baby Orange is quite a handful, as he is nosy, disobedient, and of course, just as annoying as almost all other oranges on the series.
Limburger (voiced by Rebecca Parham) – 
Gaming Grape (voiced by Shannon Jones) – A grape who likes to play video games on his PlayStation 4 and other game consoles, much to the chagrin of his mother and Game Ball, his sports-fanatic older brother. He mostly appears on the Annoying Orange Gaming channel.
Sour Rangers – These four sour candies who resemble Sour Patch Kids are parodies of the Mighty Morphin' Power Rangers, and have saved the kitchen from the threat of domination or destruction by various villains, including Marshageddon, Lord Bread, and Chivan Stews, by using their powers as well as their Gourds (which are parodies of Zords), which can be used to form Megagourds (parody of the Megazord). So far, they have starred in four episodes that chronicle their adventures.
Red (voiced by Steven Zurita) – The team leader, Red seems to be rather a braggart as well as the strongest of the four. His Gourd is a zucchini which was gifted the power of the Mussel Chowdergourd in the fourth episode.
Pink (voiced by Shira Lazar) – Pink is a gymnast and the sole female member of the team. Her Gourd is a pumpkin and was gifted the power of the Oyster Chowdergourd in the fourth episode.
Yellow (voiced by Kevin Brueck) – Yellow serves as the brains of the team. His Gourd is a squash and was gifted the power of the Clam Chowdergourd in the fourth episode.
Green (voiced by Bob Jennings) – Green is the always-ignored voice of reason; his teammates - much to his chagrin - always dismiss his strategies about confronting villains, even though his plans would be very effective. His Gourd is a courgette which was gifted the power of an unknown Chowdergourd in the fourth episode (presumed to be a scallop).

Episodes

The first Annoying Orange episode was released on October 9, 2009. Since then, the Annoying Orange YouTube channel has uploaded two or three videos a week.

Background

Before The Annoying Orange, Boedigheimer had done many talking food videos for his channel and other sites including JibJab. He said in an interview that the idea for The Annoying Orange was a combination of the talking food videos, puns and special effects he came up with and did before. The original video was planned to be titled The Annoying Apple, but when he started animating the video he found it easier to put features on orange than an apple and make it clearer.

The first Annoying Orange video initially was meant to be the only one on YouTube. However, viewers requested more videos, and after the 4th one, Boedigheimer decided to make a full-time series. Following the success of the series, he created a channel dedicated to The Annoying Orange under the name "Annoying Orange" on January 11, 2010.

Reception
The series was rated as the most viewed web series of February and March 2010 by Mashable, with over 52 million views. On April 26, 2010, the series had over 108 million views on YouTube. In June 2010, the channel had received 137 million views. By August 13, 2010, it had received 1 million subscribers. In June 2011, the channel was ranked as the eighth most subscribed and 30th most viewed, with more than 2,000,000 subscribers. On January 13, 2012, the series hit 1 billion channel views and 2.3 million subscribers. The Annoying Orange YouTube channel currently has over 11 million subscribers.

Despite the popularity of the web series with sections of the public, it has received generally unfavourable critical reviews, many citing its rude humor. Liz Shannon Miller considered the show to be "annoying for many reasons." In the web series column Pass the Mustard, Ned Hepburn called the show "pure, pure unfunny, highly concentrated, in droplet form, just purely nonsensical riffing from an Annoying Orange." Hepburn concluded, "the Annoying Orange series is one of the few that I had a physically bad reaction to. It was horrible." 411mania.com called the show "idiotic" and "creepy as hell", while other publications have referred to it as "third grade humor."

In 2014 The Annoying Orange YouTube Channel was listed on New Media Rockstars Top 100 Channels, ranked at #32.

Lawsuit 
The success of the series had received attention from H2M, a Fargo, North Dakota advertising agency, which in 2006 created its own "talking orange" character to be the spokesman for a North Dakota Department of Transportation ad campaign. Both characters were anthropomorphic oranges with ties to the Fargo-Moorhead area. Despite only slightly resembling H2M's talking orange, the Annoying Orange was looked into by H2M's attorneys as an intellectual property matter. Boedigheimer stated he had not watched H2M's talking orange videos before being informed about the disagreement, and also believed that the characters were not very similar. Boedigheimer and Grove was later sued by H2M in May 2013 for allegedly copying the character. No information has been made public about the status of the dispute.

Pay withdrawal lawsuit
On December 23, 2014, Dane Boedigheimer announced that The Annoying Orange has not been funded by Collective Digital Studios since November 2014. This has led Boedigheimer to take legal action to get paid. Due to this, the series has had a noticeably lower budget on YouTube since then, with less use of live-action footage of foods.

Controversy
On April 12, 2021, the Annoying Orange channel faced significant backlash on Twitter when it was announced by their official account that the original Annoying Orange video from 2010 would be remastered in 4K and be sold via the digital market on April 15 as an NFT. The Annoying Orange addressed the criticisms with: "NFTs do not increase Ethereum's carbon emissions, and to those that might be angry because you think I've 'sold out', I'm sorry you feel that way. We are a very small animation studio that work very hard to do what we love—which is make silly videos that make people smile". The announcement Tweet was later deleted and the video was eventually uploaded to YouTube.

Merchandise

Collective merchandise 
Since late 2011, The Collective has produced many accessories, toys and clothing with toymaker The Bridge Direct and clothing retailers such as JCPenney, Shopko and rue21. The Collective also announced a partnership in December of that year with costume manufacturer Rubie's Costume Company to produce children and adult Halloween costumes and accessories featuring characters such as Orange, Pear, Marshmallow, and Midget Apple from the web series.

Plushies 
In 2020, Annoying Orange partnered with Warren James, LLC and has produced Memory-foam plushie toys depicting every major character. The inventory of plush toys includes Orange, Pear, Midget Apple, Marshmallow, Grandpa Lemon, Grapefruit, and Passion Fruit. The toys can be purchased on the official website individually, or in a bundle of seven.

Comics
Annoying Orange comics are published by Papercutz.

Secret Agent Orange (December 11, 2012) – Reference to James Bond.
 Orange You Glad You're Not Me? (May 28, 2013) – This is a reference to the joke that ends in the punchline orange you glad... ? and has other endings depending on the joke, like "that I didn't say 'apple'?".
Pulped Fiction (August 27, 2013) – Parody of Pulp Fiction.
Tales of the Crisper (January 14, 2014) – Parody of Tales from the Crypt.
Fifty Shades of Orange (April 8, 2014) – Parody of Fifty Shades of Grey.
My Little Baloney (August 5, 2014) – Parody of My Little Pony.

Television series 

The Annoying Orange got a TV series on Cartoon Network, and it ran from 2012 to 2014 with two seasons and a total of 60 episodes.

Games

Carnage

A video game developed by Bottle Rocket Apps under the name Kitchen Carnage was released for the iPod Touch and iPhone on April 7, 2011. The game was later released in HD for the iPad on May 6, 2011, and for Android devices on October 14, 2011. The Christmas version of the game was released in December 2011 and the free version of the game, Kitchen Carnage Lite, was released March 2, 2012.

The game aims to throw different items across the kitchen into a series of blenders before the time runs out. The player is given apples and bananas at the start. When the second level is reached, tomatoes (replaced by baseballs for the 64-bit version) are added. Level 3 adds cantaloupes, level 4 pineapples, level 5 strawberries and level 6 adds Fred FiggleCorns. Kitchen Carnage was renamed to Carnage in 2021.

Splatter Up
Annoying Orange: Splatter Up is the second game by the Annoying Orange, after Carnage. The game is based on baseball, and the player slides a finger while a fruit enters the home plate. The faster the player slides, the farther he gets. The game sprites are the same as the Carnage game, the only one that does not appear in this game but appear in Carnage is Fred Figglecorn.

Skewerz
Skewerz is the most recent Annoying Orange game. The player is given fruits and vegetables to collect and they need to catch them in the skewer. When collected, you can send them to a blender called the Roomba.

See also
 Syncro-Vox, a low-cost animation technique it has been used in the series

References

External links
The Annoying Orange official website

2000s YouTube series
2009 web series debuts
2010s YouTube series
2020s YouTube series
American animated web series
American comedy web series
American LGBT-related web series
Black comedy
Cultural depictions of Abraham Lincoln
Fruit and vegetable characters 
Internet memes
Internet memes introduced in 2009
Leprechauns in popular culture
Parodies
Satirical works
Surreal comedy
The Annoying Orange
Viral videos
YouTube controversies
Works about death
Works subject to a lawsuit
Works involved in plagiarism controversies